Werner Potzernheim (8 March 1927 – 22 April 2014) was a German road bicycle and track cyclist, who won the bronze medal in the men's 1.000m sprint scratch race at the 1952 Summer Olympics in Helsinki, Finland behind Enzo Sacchi (Italy) and Lionel Cox (Australia). He was a professional rider from 1954 to 1966. Originally from Hamburg, Werner Potzernheim moved to Hanover in 1950.

References

External links
 Profile

1927 births
2014 deaths
German male cyclists
German track cyclists
Cyclists at the 1952 Summer Olympics
Olympic cyclists of Germany
Olympic bronze medalists for Germany
Cyclists from Hamburg
Sportspeople from Hanover
Olympic medalists in cycling
Medalists at the 1952 Summer Olympics
Cyclists from Lower Saxony